The 2012 Georgetown Hoyas men's soccer team represented Georgetown University during the 2012 NCAA Division I men's soccer season. The team participated in the Big East Conference, and reached the 2012 NCAA Championship, losing to Indiana in the process.

Roster

Competitions

Preseason

Regular season

Standings

Match results

Big East Tournament

NCAA Tournament

College Cup

Statistics

Transfers

References 

Georgetown Hoyas
Georgetown Hoyas men's soccer seasons
Georgetown Hoyas
Georgetown Hoyas
NCAA Division I Men's Soccer Tournament College Cup seasons